Pak Thae-song (born 14 September 1955) is a North Korean politician. He is a Vice Chairman of the Workers' Party of Korea and was the Chairman of the Supreme People's Assembly from 2019 to 2023.

References 

Living people
1955 births
Place of birth missing (living people)
Members of the Supreme People's Assembly
Members of the 8th Politburo of the Workers' Party of Korea
Members of the 8th Central Committee of the Workers' Party of Korea
Vice Chairmen of the Workers' Party of Korea and its predecessors